is a Japanese professional baseball infielder for the Orix Buffaloes in Japan's Nippon Professional Baseball.

External links

NPB.com

1984 births
Japanese baseball players
Living people
Nippon Professional Baseball infielders
Orix Buffaloes players
Saitama Seibu Lions players
Seibu Lions players
Baseball people from Kanagawa Prefecture